Mr. Mime, known in Japan as , is a Pokémon species in Nintendo and Game Freak's Pokémon franchise. Created by Ken Sugimori, Mr. Mime first appeared in the video games Pokémon Red and Blue and subsequent sequels, later appearing in various merchandise, spinoff titles and animated and printed adaptations of the franchise. Mr. Mime is voiced by Yūji Ueda in Japanese and in English, was originally voiced by Kayzie Rogers and currently by Michele Knotz.

Known as the Barrier Pokémon, Mr. Mime are gifted with the art of miming at a young age and as they mature they gain the ability to psychically generate invisible objects such as walls and other barriers. In the anime, a Mr. Mime appears as early on as a house cleaner and helper to Delia, protagonist Ash Ketchum's mother, while others are shown as entertainers or cooks. In the Pokémon Adventures manga, its abilities are utilized to create training rooms and surround an entire city with a barrier to prevent access from the outside world.

Mr. Mime's appearance has been heavily criticized by sources such as 1UP.com due to its humanoid design, as well as for combining the worst-perceived aspects of mimes and clowns. However, the character's design has also been praised by other sources in comparison to more common series characters.

Design and characteristics
Mr. Mime was one of 151 different designs conceived by Game Freak's character development team and finalized by Ken Sugimori for the first generation of Pocket Monsters games Red and Green, which were localized outside Japan as Pokémon Red and Blue. It was originally called "Barrierd" in Japanese, but when Nintendo decided to give the various Pokémon species "clever and descriptive names" related to their appearance or features when translating the game for western audiences as a means to make the characters more relatable to American children, it was renamed "Mr. Mime", based on its masculine appearance and behavior.

Appearing as an anthropomorphic creature, it has a pink head with red cheeks and blue, frizzy hair, a round, white body with a red spot in the middle, light-pink arms and legs are connected to its body by red spheres, white, five-fingered hands and blue feet that curl upward at the tips. Their hands are depicted with four fingers and an opposable thumb, with larger fingertips and red dots on their underside. However, game representations of the character featured only three fingers on each hand until the release of Pokémon Ruby and Sapphire.

Appearances

In video games
In the video game series, Mr. Mime can be acquired from an in-game trade in Pokémon Red and Blue and Pokémon FireRed and LeafGreen. It appeared in several sequels, including Pokémon Gold and Silver, Pokémon Diamond and Pokémon HeartGold and SoulSilver. In Pokémon Diamond and Pearl, Mr. Mime gains a new pre-evolved form, Mime Jr., which evolves when leveled up while knowing the move Mimic. In Pokémon Sword and Shield, Mr. Mime received a Galar-regional form of the Psychic/Ice type, which has a region-exclusive evolution, Mr. Rime, that evolves through leveling up. Gym Leader Sabrina uses a female Mr. Mime in every game she appears in except Pokémon Yellow, in which she does not have a Mr. Mime. In Pokémon Diamond and Pearl, Elite Four Lucian owns a Mr. Mime.

Outside of the main series, Mr. Mime has appeared in the Pokémon Mystery Dungeon, the Pokémon Ranger games and PokéPark Wii: Pikachu's Adventure. In Pokémon Stadium 2, Mr. Mime stars in its own minigame called "Barrier Ball". Poké Balls appear on the field and by using Mr. Mime's Barrier, send the Poké Balls to the other player's fields.

Mr. Mime appears in Pokémon Go, but is a regional Pokémon that is catchable in Europe only. It also appears in Pokémon UNITE and New Pokémon Snap.

In other media
In the anime, a Mr. Mime lives with Delia Ketchum. It does housework for her in exchange for room and board. Ash dressed as a Mr. Mime to inspire a real Mr. Mime who worked for a circus. Delia knew about this, so when a wild Mr. Mime came to her door and wanted lunch, she thought it was Ash in costume and provided it with food. When the real Ash showed up, still in costume, she was quite puzzled, but wound up keeping  as her live-in maid. It will only listen to Delia and if anyone else, even Ash, gives it orders or asks it to do something, it will normally ignore them. It used to be unknown if Delia caught Mimey or not, as she was not seen with its Pokéball. However, as of Pokémon Journeys, it is now known that Mimey does indeed have a Pokéball and he was, in fact, caught. It is also revealed in Journeys that Mr. Mime is Ash's Pokémon all along as he used it in the Battle Frontier Flute Cup as well as living with Ash at Cerise Laboratory. When Ash and his friends returned to Pallet Town following the Orange Islands saga, it was revealed that Brock and Mimey had become rather competitive regarding household tasks while the two of them were sharing the house with Delia.

In the Pokémon Adventures manga, Mr. Mime was first seen under the control of Sabrina, generating a Light Screen to seal off the whole of Saffron City. The same Mr. Mime was seen again during the Gym Leader faceoff, using its miming powers to trap Bugsy and defeat his Heracross. Mr. Mime has also appeared under the ownership of Crystal and has the ability to create invisible walls and rooms, much like Sabrina's Mr. Mime. It creates a training room for Ruby and Sapphire and Emerald to teach their Pokémon the ultimate moves Blast Burn, Hydro Cannon and Frenzy Plant.

A Mr. Mime appears in the film Pokémon Detective Pikachu, getting interrogated by the title character (voiced by Ryan Reynolds) and Tim Goodman (Justice Smith).

Critical reception
Since appearing in the Pokémon franchise, Mr. Mime has received a generally mixed reception. 1UP.com named Mr. Mime the "lamest Pokémon" in the franchise, finding it dubious that a mime Pokémon could come to exist. Retronauts stated similar, saying that it was "everything that's wrong with mimes and clowns." GamesRadar named it one of the most "fugly Pokémon" in the series, calling it creepy for its humanoid shape and dangling arms. GamesRadar staff, however, noted it was among the more popular Pokémon. IGN editor "Pokémon of the Day Chick" has expressed her dislike of the character in multiple articles, describing it as an "abomination" and suggesting that designers were on drugs when they created it. GamesRadar editor Carolyn Gudmundson called Mr. Mime one of the most "infamous" examples of humanoid Pokémon in the series, which  listing Mr. Mime and Jynx as two of "the most infamous" examples. Jim Sterling of Destructoid included it in their list of 30 "rubbish" Pokémon, describing Mr. Mime "as easily one of the shittiest Pokémon in all of history." Kyle Hilliard of GameInformer claimed that Mr. Mime as the weirdest Pokémon, and said it is the only Pokémon to date with a title, "I’m not entirely convinced Mr. Mime isn’t just a failed clown trying to disembark from the human species." Joe Anderton of Digital Spy criticize Mr. Mime in the film Detective Pikachu and called it as the worst Pokémon, by stating that "Its name doesn't make any sense. It gets outclassed by most Psychic types, and it's just plain creepy."

However, other sources have instead praised the character's appearance. In the book Gaming Cultures and Place in Asia-Pacific, David Surman defended Mr. Mime's design, suggesting that Sugimori developed it—along with Jynx—to draw upon the humor of heta-uma (a term meaning bad/nice). The book notes that the designs "oscillate between the poles of good and bad," and as a result offer diversity within the game and invite scrutiny from players. The Coventry Evening Telegraph also praised its design, stating the character was "more interesting" in comparison to more popular Pokémon like Squirtle. Elijah Watson of Complex described Mr. Mime as the best Pokémon, and stated that Mr. Mime is "weird looking," but it's also equipped with a good selection of non-damaging and damaging moves. Steven Bogos of The Escapist listed Mr. Mime as their 21st favorite Pokémon, describing it as "super unique and clever." Patricia Hernandez of Polygon stated that Mr. Mime "stole the show" in the film Detective Pikachu, while Austen Goslin of Polygon called Mr. Mime's appearance in the movie "terrifying." In an interview with GameSpot, lead actor of the film Justice Smith revealed that the Mr. Mime interrogation scene was one of his favorites.

References

External links

 Mr. Mime on Bulbapedia
 Mr. Mime on Pokemon.com

Fictional mimes
Fictional clowns
Fictional butlers
Pokémon species
Video game characters introduced in 1996
Fictional psychics
Fictional fairies and sprites
Fictional elves
Video game characters with ice or cold abilities
Video game characters who use magic
Fictional characters who can manipulate light
Fictional characters with energy-manipulation abilities
Fictional characters who can teleport